Michael Andrew Martin O'Neill  (born 5 July 1969) is a Northern Irish football manager and former player, who is currently manager of the  Northern Ireland national team, his second spell in charge, having previously managed them between 2011 and 2020.

O'Neill started his playing career in his native Northern Ireland with Coleraine, before playing for a number of clubs in England, Scotland and the United States, including Newcastle United, Dundee United, Hibernian, Wigan Athletic and Portland Timbers. He was capped 31 times at international level by Northern Ireland, scoring four goals.

His first managerial role was with Brechin City from 2006 to 2008. He then joined Shamrock Rovers, where he won two League of Ireland titles and the Setanta Cup. He became Northern Ireland manager in 2011 and, under his management, they qualified for their first ever European Champions finals in 2016. In November 2019, O'Neill was appointed manager at Stoke City. He lasted just under 3 years in the role before he was sacked in August 2022.

Early life
O'Neill was born in Portadown, County Armagh, to parents Dessie and Patricia O'Neill. His father, Dessie played hurling for All Saints and Ulster whilst his brother Sean, was a track athlete who competed in the Men's 800 metres at the 1982 Commonwealth Games.

Raised Catholic, he briefly attended Presentation Convent Primary School before the family moved to Ballymena, County Antrim. In Ballymena he attended All Saints Primary School and later St Louis Grammar School, where he won the Northern Ireland Schools FA Cup in 1980 against St Oliver Plunkett whose side included Jim Magilton. He was also a promising Gaelic games player, representing Antrim GAA minors, before concentrating on football. He played youth football for Ballymena team Star United for four years before joining intermediate club Chimney Corner as a 14-year-old. His manager Alec McKee didn't think it was right to try to integrate a 14/15-year-old into his first team and thought he should play for Coleraine's reserve side.

Club career
O'Neill was brought in to Coleraine by former Northern Ireland internationals Bertie Peacock and Jim Platt, making his debut in the Irish League at the age of 15 and was a regular in the side by the age of 18. After playing against Dundee United in a UEFA Cup tie in 1987 O'Neill came close to joining the Scottish club.

In October 1987 he was signed by Newcastle United for a £100,000 fee. After scoring 13 goals in 22 appearances during his first season and helping Newcastle finish eighth in the First Division, O'Neill suffered from injuries and loss of form in his second season which saw Newcastle relegated to the Second Division.

O'Neill joined Dundee United in August 1989 for a club record fee of £350,000. A difficult relationship with manager Jim McLean came to a head in 1991 when O'Neill refused to extend his contract and was dropped from the first team. He left the club in 1993 joining Hibernian where he had three successful seasons under the management of Alex Miller. O'Neill agreed to join Austrian club Sturm Graz on a Bosman free transfer in 1996 but changed his mind after an offer to return to English football with Coventry City where he spent just over two years.

After spending time on loan to Aberdeen and Reading during the 1997–98 season O'Neill left Coventry to sign for Wigan Athletic in September 1998. He later played for St Johnstone, Portland Timbers, Clydebank, Glentoran and Ayr United.

International career
O'Neill played for the under-21, under-23, B and full international teams of Northern Ireland. He scored four goals for the national team, including two in a 5–3 win against Austria.

Managerial career
O'Neill retired from playing football in 2004 and began a career in financial services. A year later he took a part-time role as assistant manager at Cowdenbeath, working with Mixu Paatelainen.

Brechin City
O'Neill became manager of Scottish side Brechin City in April 2006. He won the Second Division Manager of the Month award in both December 2007 and October 2008. O'Neill was released by Brechin City to join Shamrock Rovers on 13 December 2008.

Shamrock Rovers
At the press conference when unveiled as Rovers manager, O'Neill cited Gordon Strachan as his main managerial influence. He was awarded the Irish Soccer Writers Manager of the Month award for July 2009 and eventually guided The Hoops to second place in  the 2009 League of Ireland. In October 2010, he guided Shamrock Rovers to win the 2010 League of Ireland title, their first league championship since 1994. O'Neill led Rovers to the 2011 Setanta Sports Cup and then made history by being the first manager of a League of Ireland team to reach the group stages of a European competition. Rovers defeated Partizan Belgrade in the play-off round of the 2011–12 UEFA Europa League. Shamrock Rovers retained their league title in the 2011 season. New contract talks between O'Neill and Shamrock Rovers stalled and he left the club in December 2011. O'Neill won the Soccer Writers Association Personality of the Year award for 2011.

Northern Ireland
O'Neill was appointed manager of Northern Ireland on 28 December 2011, with one report stating he was "the first Catholic in 50 years to manage Northern Ireland". However, this is almost certainly untrue, since previous managers Lawrie Sanchez (2004–07) and Lawrie McMenemy (1998–99) were both educated in Roman Catholic schools. O'Neill's first game in charge ended in defeat with a 3–0 loss to Norway. In his next game an inexperienced Northern Ireland team were beaten 6–0 by the Netherlands in Amsterdam. During their 2014 FIFA World Cup qualification, Northern Ireland earned some creditable results, including a 1–1 draw away to Portugal and a 1–0 home win against Russia. In November 2013, O'Neill agreed a new two-year deal with Irish Football Association to remain as Northern Ireland manager.

Northern Ireland qualified for their first ever European Championship, Euro 2016 in France after beating Greece 3–1 at Windsor Park on 8 October 2015. It was the first time in 30 years that Northern Ireland had qualified for a major tournament. At the tournament itself he led the side to the second round, losing narrowly to Wales but recorded a surprise victory over Ukraine in the group stages. In January 2018, O'Neill turned down an offer to become manager of Scotland following discussions with the Scottish Football Association. 

O'Neill initially continued as Northern Ireland manager after his appointment by Stoke City in November 2019. He had intended to stay on for UEFA Euro 2020 playoffs, which had been scheduled for March 2020, but these were postponed by the COVID-19 pandemic. With the Euro 2020 playoffs delayed at least until the autumn of 2020, O'Neill resigned as Northern Ireland manager on 22 April.

Stoke City
O'Neill was appointed manager of EFL Championship club Stoke City on 8 November 2019. He joined Stoke with the side bottom of the 2019–20 EFL Championship table after struggling under the management of Nathan Jones. O'Neill won his first match in charge of Stoke, 4–2 away at Barnsley on 9 November. Stoke began to improve and secured vital victories over Wigan Athletic, Luton Town, Sheffield Wednesday and Huddersfield Town, helping the team move out of the relegation zone at the turn of the year. In the January transfer window O'Neill cancelled the loans of Cameron Carter-Vickers, Mark Duffy and Scott Hogan, whilst also letting Peter Etebo, Badou Ndiaye and Ryan Woods leave on loan. Into the team came Northern Irish midfielder Jordan Thompson from Blackpool, center-back James Chester on loan from Aston Villa and young midfielder Tashan Oakley-Boothe from Tottenham Hotspur. Stoke beat Hull City 5–1 on 7 March 2020 moving the team three points above the drop with nine remaining matches. The Championship was suspended on 13 March due to the COVID-19 pandemic.

Championship squads returned to training on 25 May with the intention to  finish the season behind closed doors. Stoke's preparations for the season restart were disrupted after O'Neill tested positive for coronavirus on 9 June which caused a training match against Manchester United to be cancelled. Stoke won four of the remaining nine matches to avoid relegation and finish in 15th position, finishing eight points clear of the relegation zone.

Due to the ongoing pandemic the 2020–21 season began later in September with matches continuing to played behind closed doors. O'Neill brought in a number of free transfers including James Chester, Morgan Fox, Steven Fletcher and Mikel John Obi with Jacob Brown the only arrival to have been bought. Stoke began the season well with Tyrese Campbell in decent form, winning eight of their first 16 matches and were just outside the play-off places at the beginning of December. However a number of injuries to key players most notably to Tyrese Campbell saw goals dry up and the team went nine games without a win at the turn of the year. Stoke were unable to put a sustained run of results together in March and April and ended the season in mid-table.

Stoke had a busy 2021 summer transfer window with the permanent departure of 13 players. This enabled O'Neill to add to his squad with the arrivals of Jack Bonham, Romaine Sawyers, Sam Surridge, Mario Vrančić and Ben Wilmot. Stoke made a positive start to the season and were just outside the play-off places at the turn of the year. However a poor second half of the season saw Stoke drop down into mid-table and again finish in 14th position. Stoke made a poor start to the 2022–23 season, with one win from five games, O'Neill was sacked by the club on 25 August 2022.

Return to Northern Ireland
On 7 December 2022, O'Neill returned for a second spell as Northern Ireland manager on a five-and-a-half year contract.

Personal life
Following Northern Ireland's performance at UEFA Euro 2016, O'Neill was appointed a Member of the Order of the British Empire (MBE) in the 2017 New Year Honours, "for services to football and the community in Northern Ireland." In April 2022, O'Neill underwent hip replacement surgery.

Career statistics

Club

International

Managerial statistics

Honours

Player
Wigan Athletic
 Football League Trophy: 1998–99

Glentoran
 Irish League Premier Division: 2002–03
 Irish League Cup: 2002–03
 County Antrim Shield: 2003

Manager
Shamrock Rovers
League of Ireland Premier Division: 2010, 2011
Setanta Sports Cup: 2011

Individual
 SWAI Personality of the Year: 2011
 Philips Sports Manager of the Year: 2015 (joint winner)
BBC Sports Personality of the Year Coach Award: 2015
 Scottish Football League Second Division Manager of the Month: December 2007, October 2008

Decorations
 Member of the Order of the British Empire: 2017

References

External links

 

1969 births
Living people
People from Portadown
Association footballers from Northern Ireland
Association football midfielders
Chimney Corner F.C. players
Coleraine F.C. players
Newcastle United F.C. players
Dundee United F.C. players
Hibernian F.C. players
Coventry City F.C. players
Aberdeen F.C. players
Reading F.C. players
Wigan Athletic F.C. players
St Johnstone F.C. players
Portland Timbers (2001–2010) players
Clydebank F.C. (1965) players
Glentoran F.C. players
Ayr United F.C. players
NIFL Premiership players
English Football League players
Scottish Football League players
Premier League players
Scottish Premier League players
A-League (1995–2004) players
Northern Ireland under-21 international footballers
Northern Ireland B international footballers
Northern Ireland international footballers
Expatriate association footballers from Northern Ireland
Expatriate sportspeople from Northern Ireland in the United States
Expatriate soccer players in the United States
Football managers from Northern Ireland
Brechin City F.C. managers
Shamrock Rovers F.C. managers
Northern Ireland national football team managers
Stoke City F.C. managers
Scottish Football League managers
League of Ireland managers
English Football League managers
UEFA Euro 2016 managers
Expatriate football managers from Northern Ireland
Expatriates from Northern Ireland in the Republic of Ireland
Expatriate football managers in the Republic of Ireland
Members of the Order of the British Empire